The 2009 Dutch Open was the 37th edition of the Dutch Open.

Draw

Dutch Open (darts))